A radiosensitizer is an agent that makes tumor cells more sensitive to radiation therapy.  It is sometimes also known as a radiation sensitizer or radio-enhancer.

Mechanism of action 
Conventional chemotherapeutics are currently being used in conjunction with radiation therapy to increase its effectiveness. Examples include the fluoropyrimidines, gemcitabine and platinum analogs; fluoropyrimidines increase sensitivity by dysregulating S-phase cell cycle checkpoints in tumor cells. Gemcitabine progresses through a similar mechanism, causing cells in the S-phase to disrepair DNA damage caused by the radiation. Platinum analogs such as cisplatin inhibit DNA repair by cross linking strands, and so aggravate the effects of DNA damage induced by radiation.

Limitations 
One of the major limitations of radiotherapy is that the cells of solid tumors become deficient in oxygen. Solid tumors can outgrow their blood supply, causing a low-oxygen state known as hypoxia. Oxygen is a potent radiosensitizer, increasing the effectiveness of a given dose of radiation by forming DNA-damaging free radicals. Tumor cells in a hypoxic environment may be as much as 2 to 3 times more resistant to radiation damage than those in a normal oxygen environment. Much research has been devoted to overcoming this problem including the use of high pressure oxygen tanks, blood substitutes that carry increased oxygen, hypoxic cell radiosensitizers such as misonidazole and metronidazole, and hypoxic cytotoxins, such as tirapazamine.

Drug development 
As of September 2016, there are a number of radiosensitizers in clinical trials.

References

External links
 Radiosensitizer entry in the public domain NCI Dictionary of Cancer Terms

Tumor markers